The Province of Posen was a province of the Kingdom of Prussia from 1848 to 1920. Posen was established in 1848 following the Greater Poland Uprising as a successor to the Grand Duchy of Posen, which in turn was annexed by Prussia in 1815 from Napoleon's Duchy of Warsaw. It became part of the German Empire in 1871. After World War I, Posen was briefly part of the Free State of Prussia within Weimar Germany, but was dissolved in 1920 when most of its territory was ceded to the Second Polish Republic by the Treaty of Versailles, and the remaining German territory was later re-organized into Posen-West Prussia in 1922.

Posen (present-day Poznań, Poland) was the provincial capital.

Geography 
The land is mostly flat, drained by two major watershed systems; the Noteć (German: Netze) in the north and the Warta (Warthe) in the center. Ice Age glaciers left moraine deposits and the land is speckled with hundreds of "finger lakes", streams flowing in and out on their way to one of the two rivers.

Agriculture was the primary industry. The three-field system was used to grow a variety of crops, primarily rye, sugar beet, potatoes, other grains, and some tobacco and hops. Significant parcels of wooded land provided building materials and firewood. Small numbers of livestock existed, including geese, but a fair number of sheep were herded.

The  area roughly corresponded to the historic region of Greater Poland. For more than a century, it was part of the Prussian Partition, with a brief exception during the Napoleonic Wars. When this area came under Prussian control, the feudal system was still in force. It was officially ended in Prussia (see Freiherr vom Stein) in 1810 (1864 in Congress Poland), but lingered in some practices until the late 19th century.  The situation was thus that (primarily) Polish serfs lived and worked side by side with (predominantly) free German settlers. Though the settlers were given initial advantages, in time their lots were not much different. Serfs worked for the noble lord, who took care of them. Settlers worked for themselves and took care of themselves, but paid taxes to the lord.

Typically, an estate would have its manor and farm buildings, and a village nearby for the Polish laborers. Near that village, there might be a German settlement. And in the woods, there would be a forester's dwelling. The estate owners, usually of the nobility, owned the local grist mill, and often other types of mills or perhaps a distillery. In many places, windmills dotted the landscape, reminding one of the earliest settlers, the Dutch, who began the process of turning unproductive river marshes into fields. This process was finished by the German settlers employed to reclaim unproductive lands (not only marshland) for the host estate owners.

History 
Greater Poland became Prussian in 1772 (Netze District) and 1793 (South Prussia) during the First and Second Partition of Poland. After Prussia's defeat in the Napoleonic Wars, the territory was attached to the Duchy of Warsaw in 1807 upon the Franco-Prussian Treaty of Tilsit. In 1815 during the Congress of Vienna, Prussia gained the western third of the Warsaw duchy, which was about half of former South Prussia. Prussia then administered this province as the semi-autonomous Grand Duchy of Posen, which lost most of its exceptional status already after the 1830 November Uprising in Congress Poland, as the Prussian authorities feared a Polish national movement which would have swept away the Holy Alliance system in Central Europe. Instead Prussian Germanisation measures increased under Oberpräsident Eduard Heinrich von Flottwell, who had replaced Duke-governor Antoni Radziwiłł.

A first Greater Poland Uprising in 1846 failed, as the leading insurgents around Karol Libelt and Ludwik Mierosławski were reported to the Prussian police and arrested for high treason. Their trial at the Berlin Kammergericht court gained them enormous popularity even among German national liberals, who themselves were suppressed by the Carlsbad Decrees. Both were released in the March Revolution of 1848 and triumphantly carried through the streets.

At the same time, a Polish national committee gathered at Poznań and demanded independence. The Prussian Army under General Friedrich August Peter von Colomb at first retired. King Frederick William IV of Prussia as well as the new Prussian commissioner, Karl Wilhelm von Willisen, promised a renewed autonomy status.

However, both among the German-speaking population of the province as well as in the Prussian capital, anti-Polish sentiments arose. While the local Posen (Poznań) Parliament voted 26 to 17 votes against joining German Confederation, on 3 April 1848 the Frankfurt Parliament ignored the vote, unsuccessfully  attempting its status change to a common Prussian province, as well as its incorporation into the German Confederation. The Frankfurt parliamentarian Carl Friedrich Wilhelm Jordan vehemently spoke against Polish autonomy. The assembly at first attempted to divide the Posen duchy into two parts: the Province of Posen, which would have been given to the German population and annexed to a newly created Greater Germany, and the Province of Gniezno, which would have been given to the Poles and remain outside of Germany. Because of the protest of Polish politicians, this plan failed and the integrity of the duchy was preserved.

Nevertheless, when the Prussian troops had finally crushed the Greater Polish revolt, after a series of broken assurances, on 9 February 1849 the Prussian authorities renamed the duchy as the Province of Posen. In spite of that, the territory formally remained outside of the German Confederation (and thus Germany) until the German Confederation was dissolved and the North German Confederation was established, which occurred in 1866. Nevertheless, the Prussian Kings retained the title "Grand Duke of Posen" until the German and Prussian monarchy finally expired in 1918, following the abdication of William II.

With the unification of Germany after the Franco-Prussian War of 1870–71, the Province of Posen became part of the German Empire, and the city of Posen was officially named an imperial residence city. Bismarck's hostility towards the Poles was already well known, as in 1861 he had written in a letter to his sister: "Hit the Poles so hard that they despair of their life; I have full sympathy for their condition, but if we want to survive we can only exterminate them." His dislike was firmly entrenched in traditions of Prussian mentality and history. There was little need for discussions in Prussian circles, as most of them, including the monarch, agreed with his views. Poles suffered from discrimination by the Prussian state; numerous oppressive measures were implemented to eradicate the Polish community's identity and culture.

The Polish inhabitants of Posen, who faced discrimination and even forced Germanization, favored the French side during the Franco-Prussian War. France and Napoleon III were known for their support and sympathy for the Poles under Prussian rule Demonstrations at news of Prussian-German victories manifested Polish independence feelings and calls were also made for Polish recruits to desert from the Prussian Army, though these went mostly unheeded. Bismarck regarded these as an indication of a Slavic-Roman encirclement and even a threat to unified Germany. Under German Chancellor Otto von Bismarck renewed Germanisation policies began, including an increase of the police, a colonization commission, and the Kulturkampf. The German Eastern Marches Society (Hakata) pressure group was founded in 1894 and in 1904, special legislation was passed against the Polish population. The legislation of 1908 allowed for the confiscation of Polish-owned property. The Prussian authorities did not permit the development of industries in Posen, so the duchy's economy was dominated by high-level agriculture.

At the end of World War I, the fate of the province was undecided. The Polish inhabitants demanded the region be included in the newly independent Second Polish Republic, while the German minority refused any territorial concessions. Another Greater Poland Uprising broke out on 27 December 1918, a day after Ignacy Jan Paderewski's speech. The uprising received little support from the Polish government in Warsaw. After the success of the uprising, Posen province was until mid-1919 an independent state with its own government, currency and military. With the signing of the Treaty of Versailles in 1919, most of the province, composed of the areas with a Polish majority, was ceded to Poland and was reformed as the Poznań Voivodeship. This province was dissolved in 1938, when its territory was split between the neighboring Prussian provinces of Silesia, Pomerania and Brandenburg. In 1939, the territory of the former province of Posen was annexed by Nazi Germany and made part of Reichsgau Danzig-West Prussia and Reichsgau Wartheland (initially Reichsgau Posen). By the time World War II ended in May 1945, it had been overrun by the Red Army.

Following Germany's defeat in World War in 1945, at Stalin's demand all of the German territory east of the newly established Oder–Neisse line of the Potsdam Agreement was either turned over to the Poland or the Soviet Union. All historical parts of the province came under Polish control, and the remaining ethnic German population was expelled by force.

Dissolution after 1918

Religious and ethnic composition 

This region was inhabited by a Polish majority, with German and Jewish minorities and a smattering of other ethnic groups. Almost all the Poles were Roman Catholic, and most of the Germans were Protestant. The small numbers of Jews were primarily in the larger communities, mostly in skilled crafts, local commerce and regional trading. The smaller a community, the more likely it was to be either all Polish or German. These "pockets of ethnicity" existed side by side, with German villages being the most dense in the northwestern areas. Under Prussia's Germanization policies, the population became more German until the end of the 19th century, when the trend reversed (in the Ostflucht). This was despite efforts of the government in Berlin to prevent it, establishing the Settlement Commission to buy land from Poles and make it available for sale only to Germans.

The province's large number of resident Germans resulted from constant immigration since the Middle Ages, when the first settlers arrived in the course of the Ostsiedlung. Although many of those had been Polonized over time, a continuous immigration resulted in maintaining a large German community. The 18th century Jesuit-led Counter-Reformation enacted severe restrictions on German Protestants. At the end of the 18th century when Prussia seized the area during the Partitions of Poland, thousands of German colonists were sent by Prussian officials to Germanize the area.

During the first half of the 19th century, the German population grew due to state sponsored colonisation. In the second half, the Polish population grew gradually due to the Ostflucht and a higher birthrate among the Poles. In the Kulturkampf, mainly Protestant Prussia sought to reduce the Catholic impact on its society. Posen was hit severely by these measures due to its large, mainly Polish Catholic population. Many Catholic Germans in Posen joined with ethnic Poles in opposition to anti-Catholic Kulturkampf measures. Following the Kulturkampf, the German Empire for nationalist reasons implemented Germanisation programs. One measure was to set up a Settlement Commission to attract German settlers to counter the Polish population's higher growth. However, this failed, even when accompanied by additional legal measures. The Polish language was eventually banned from use in schools and government offices as part of the Germanisation policies.

There is a notable disparity between German statistics gathered by the Prussian administration, and the Polish estimates conducted after 1918. According to the Prussian census of 1905, the number of German speakers in the Province of Posen was approximately 38.5% (which included colonists, military stationed in the area and German administration), while after 1918 the number of Germans in the Poznan Voivodship, which closely corresponded to province of Posen, was only 7%. According to Witold Jakóbczyk, the disparity between the number of ethnic Germans and the number of German speakers is because Prussian authorities placed ethnic Germans and the German-speaking Jewish minority into the same class. Around 161,000 Germans in the province were officials, soldiers and their families settled in the region by German Empire. In addition, there was a considerable exodus of Germans from the Second Polish Republic after the latter was established. There was also Polonization of local Catholic Germans. Another reason of the disparity is that some border areas of the province, inhabited mostly by Germans (including Piła), remained in Germany after 1918. According to Polish authors, the real share of Poles in 1910 was 65% (rather than 61.5% claimed by official census).

Statistics

Area: 28,970 km2

Population

1816:   820,176
1868: 1,537,300 (Bydgoszcz 550,900 - Poznan 986,400)
1871: 1,583,843
Religion: 1871
Catholics    1,009,885
Protestants    511,429
Jews            61,982
others             547
1875: 1,606,084
1880: 1,703,397
1900: 1,887,275
1905: 1,986,267
1910: 2,099,831 (Bromberg - 763,947, Posen - 1,335,884)

Divisions

Prussian provinces were subdivided into government regions (Regierungsbezirke), in Posen:
 Regierungsbezirk Posen 17,503 km2
 Regierungsbezirk Bromberg 11,448 km2
These regions were again subdivided into districts called Kreise. Cities would have their own "Stadtkreis" (urban district) and the surrounding rural area would be named for the city, but referred to as a "Landkreis" (rural district). In the case of Posen, the Landkreis was split into two: Landkreis Posen West, and Landkreis Posen East.

Data is from Prussian censuses, during a period of state-sponsored Germanization, and includes military garrisons. It is often criticized as being falsified.

The German figure includes the German-speaking Jewish population.

Presidents

The province was headed by presidents.

Notable people 
(in alphabetical order)
(see also Notable people of Grand Duchy of Posen)

 Stanisław Adamski (1875–1967), Polish priest, social and political activist of  the Union of Catholic Societies of Polish Workers, founder and editor of the 'Robotnik' (Worker) weekly
 Leo Baeck (1873–1956), German rabbi, scholar, and theologian
 Tomasz K. Bartkiewcz (1865–1931), Polish composer and organist, co-founder of the Singer Circles Union (Związek Kół Śpiewackich)
 Wernher von Braun (1912 –1977) German rocket engineer and space architect; a leading figure in the development of rocket technology, from the V1 & V2 to the Saturn rocket that powered the first Moon landing, and credited as being the "Father of Rocket Science"
 Czesław Czypicki (1855–1926), Polish lawyer from Kożmin, activist for the singers' societies
 Michał Drzymała (1857–1937), Polish peasant
 Ferdinand Hansemann (1861–1900), Prussian politician, co-founder of the German Eastern Marches Society
 Paul von Hindenburg (1847–1934), German field marshal and statesman, last President of Germany before Adolf Hitler
 Józef Kościelski (1845–1911), Polish politician and parliamentarian, co-founder of the Straż (Guard) society
 Józef Krzymiński (1858–1940), Polish physician, social and political activist, member of parliament
 Władysław Marcinkowski (1858–1947), Polish sculptor who created a monument of Adam Mickiewicz in Milosław
 Bernd Baron von Maydell (1934–2018), German lawyer and author
 Władysław Niegolewski (1819–85), Polish liberal politician and member of parliament, insurgent in 1846, 1848 and 1863, cofounder of TCL and CTG
 Cyryl Ratajski (1875–1942), president of Poznań 1922–34
 Arthur Ruppin (1876–1943), pioneering sociologist, Zionist thinker and leader, co-founder of Tel Aviv
 Karol Rzepecki (1865–1931), Polish bookseller, social and political activist, editor of Sokół (Falcon) magazine
 Antoni Stychel (1859–1935), Polish priest, member of parliament, president of the Union of the Catholic Societies of Polish Workers (Związek Katolickich Towarzystw Robotników Polskich)
 Roman Szymański (1840–1908), Polish political activist, publicist, editor of Orędownik magazine
Alfred Trzebinski (1902–1946), SS-physician at several Nazi concentration camps executed for war crimes
 Aniela Tułodziecka (1853–1932), Polish educational activist of the Warta Society (Towarzystwo Przyjaciół Wzajemnego Pouczania się i Opieki nad Dziećmi Warta)
 Piotr Wawrzyniak (1849–1910), Polish priest, economic and educational activist, patron of Union of the Earnings and Economic Societies (Związek Spółek Zarobkowych i Gospodarczych)

Notes

References

External links
 
 Administrative subdivision of the province (in 1910)

 
Provinces of Prussia
Prussian Partition
History of Poznań
1848 establishments in Prussia
1919 disestablishments in Germany
Former eastern territories of Germany